Osmosis is the movement of molecules through a membrane.

Osmosis may also refer to:

Physical
 Capillary osmosis, the motion of liquid in a porous body
 Electro-osmosis, the motion of liquid induced by an applied potential
 Forward osmosis, a process that uses a semi-permeable membrane to effect separation of water from dissolved solutes
 Reverse osmosis, a membrane-technology filtration method
 Pressure-retarded osmosis, the salinity gradient energy retrieved from the difference in the salt concentration between seawater and river water
 Standing gradient osmosis, the reabsorption of water against the osmotic gradient in the intestines

Popular culture
 Osmosis Jones, a 2001 live-action/animated comedy film and the main character
 Osmosis Jones (soundtrack), the soundtrack for the named film
 Osmosis Records (Osmose Productions), a French independent record label
 Ozzmosis, a studio album by heavy metal musician Ozzy Osbourne
 Osmosis, a reissue of an album originally released in 1961 as Bash!
 Osmosis (TV series), a 2019 science-fiction Netflix series

Other uses
 Osmosis (band), a band whose song "She (Didn't Remember My Name)" peaked at number 2 in Australia in 1974; see List of Top 25 singles for 1974 in Australia
 Osmosis demonstration, a set of techniques used in schools to instruct students
 Social osmosis, the indirect infusion of social/cultural knowledge
 Osmosis, is a command line Java application for processing OpenStreetMap data
 Osmosis (solitaire), a solitaire card game

See also 
 
 Electrokinetic phenomena
 Osmotic pressure
 Osmotrophy
 Passive transport
 Plasmolysis